Garry Lee and Showdown are a country band from Medicine Hat, Alberta, Canada. They are best known for their underground hit song "The Rodeo Song" (written by Gaye Delorme) and featuring prominent use of profanity, from the 1980 album, Welcome to the Rodeo.

In a 2018 interview, the band members stated that they had heard Gaye Delorme play the song at a bar and decided to cover it, though royalties were not discussed.

Studio album

Singles

References

Canadian country music groups